Olena Yuriivna Kravets (born 1 January 1977) is an actress, producer and television host from Ukraine.

Biography
Olena Maliashenko was born in Kryvyi Rih in Dnipropetrovsk Oblast, she is the only daughter of Yurii Viktorovych Maliashenko and Nadiia Fedorivna Maliashenko (a metallurgist and economist, respectively). She is best known internationally as the executive director of the Kvartal 95 Studio since 2000.

On 21 September 2002, she married the producer Serhii Kravets and adopted the surname of her husband. From this marriage, they have three children: Mariia, born on February 24, 2003, and twins Ivan and Kateryna, born on August 15, 2016.

On the occasion of her second pregnancy, she launched her own line of specialized clothing for pregnant women under the name "OneSize by Lena Kravets".

References

Ukrainian film actresses
Ukrainian television presenters
Ukrainian stage actresses
20th-century Ukrainian actresses
21st-century Ukrainian actresses
Inter (TV channel) people
Kryvyi Rih National University alumni
Mass media people from Kryvyi Rih
Ukrainian women television presenters
Living people
1977 births